The 1994 Northeast Conference men's basketball tournament was played February 28–March 3, 1994. The tournament featured the league's ten teams, seeded based on their conference record. Rider won the championship, their second consecutive, and received the conference's automatic bid to the 1994 NCAA Tournament.

Format
The NEC Men's Basketball Tournament consisted of a ten-team playoff format with all games played at the venue of the higher seed. The first round was played by the four lowest seeds (7–10) and the other teams received a bye.

Bracket

All-tournament team
Tournament MVP in bold.

References

Northeast Conference men's basketball tournament
Tournament
Northeast Conference men's basketball tournament
Northeast Conference men's basketball tournament
Northeast Conference men's basketball tournament